In Irish Mythology, Ethal Anbuail, sometimes spelled Anubhail, is one of the Tuatha Dé Danann, and king at Sidhe Uamuin in Connacht. He had a daughter, Cáer.

Appearances in Irish Mythology
Ethal is primarily known because of how Ailill mac Máta and Dagda went to war with him to marry his daughter Cáer to Aengus, son of Dagda. In this war, Ethal's kingdom is destroyed by the forces of Dagda and Ailill. This is told in the story of the "Dream of Oengus."

Texts
Aisling Óenguso: The Dream of Óengus
The Song of Wandering Aengus: The Song of Wandering Aengus

Characters in Irish mythology
Mythological kings